The 2017 NC State Wolfpack football team represented North Carolina State University during the 2017 NCAA Division I FBS football season. The Wolfpack played their home games at Carter–Finley Stadium in Raleigh, North Carolina and competed in the Atlantic Division of the Atlantic Coast Conference. They were led by fifth-year head coach Dave Doeren. They finished the season 9–4, 6–2 in ACC play to finish in second place in the Atlantic Division. They received a bid to the Sun Bowl, where they defeated Arizona State.

On December 1, Doeren received a five-year contract extension.

Previous season
The Wolfpack finished the 2016 season 7–6, 3–5 in ACC play to finish in a tie for fourth place in the Atlantic Division. They received an invite to the Independence Bowl where they defeated Vanderbilt 41–17.

Schedule
NC State announced its 2017 football schedule on January 24, 2017. The 2017 schedule consisted of six home games, five away games, and one neutral site game in the regular season. The Wolfpack hosted ACC foes Clemson, Louisville, North Carolina, and Syracuse, and traveled to Boston College, Florida State, Pittsburgh, and Wake Forest.

The Wolfpack hosted two of the four non-conference opponents, Furman from the Southern Conference and Marshall from Conference USA, and traveled to Notre Dame, who competes as an independent. NC State met South Carolina from the Southeastern Conference at Bank of America Stadium in Charlotte, North Carolina.

Coaching staff

Roster

Roster Source:

Game summaries

vs. South Carolina

Marshall

Furman

at Florida State

Syracuse

Louisville

at Pittsburgh

at Notre Dame

Clemson

at Boston College

at Wake Forest

North Carolina

Arizona State–Sun Bowl

2018 NFL draft

The Wolfpack had seven players selected in the 2018 NFL draft, which is a school record.

Rankings

References

NC State
NC State Wolfpack football seasons
Sun Bowl champion seasons
NC State Wolfpack football